ID or its variants may refer to:
 Identity document, a document used to verify a person's identity
 Identifier, a symbol which uniquely identifies an object or record

People
 I. D. Ffraid (1814–1875), Welsh poet and Calvinistic Methodist minister
 I. D. McMaster (1920s–2004), American assistant district attorney
 I. D. Serebryakov (1917–1998), Russian lexicographer and translator

Places
 İd or Narman, a town in Turkey
 Idaho, US (postal abbreviation ID)
 Indonesia, ISO 3166-1 alpha-2 country code "ID"
 Indonesian language, ISO 639-1 language code "ID"

Arts, entertainment, and media

Music
 The Id (band), an English new wave/synthpop band

Albums
 I.D. (album), a 1989 album by The Wailers Band
 ID (Michael Patrick Kelly album), a 2017 studio album by Michael Patrick Kelly
 Id (Siddharta album), 1999
 [id] (Veil of Maya album), 2010
 ID, an album by Anna Maria Jopek
 The Id (album), a 2001 studio album by Macy Gray

Songs
 ID (song), a 2015 single by Kygo
 I.D., a 2004 song by Kasabian from their self-titled album

Periodicals
 I.D. (magazine), an American magazine focusing on Architecture, Graphic and Industrial Design
 i-D, a British fashion magazine
 Ideas and Discoveries (i.D.), a magazine covering science, with heavy interest in social science

Television
 "I.D." (Law & Order), an episode of Law & Order
 Investigation Discovery, an American cable television channel

Film
 I.D. (1995 film), a British film about football hooliganism
 I.D. (2012 film), an Indian Hindi drama
 The Id (film), a 2016 American thriller/horror film

Other uses in arts, entertainment, and media
 I.D. (play), 2003 British play by Anthony Sher
 Id (comics), a manhwa by Kim Daewoo, art by A. T. Kenny'
 Id, a fictional kingdom in The Wizard of Id, an American comic strip
 iD (video game), a 1986 computer game
 Investigation Discovery, stylized as "ID", an American pay television network

Brands and enterprises
 ID (public relations), a public relations firm
 ID Labs, an American music production and engineering team
 iD Mobile, a telephone network owned by Carphone Warehouse
 Interlink Airlines (IATA airline code ID), an airline based in Johannesburg, South Africa
 Batik Air (IATA airline code ID), an airline based in Jakarta, Indonesia
 Citroën ID, a variant of the Citroën DS car
 Volkswagen ID. series, a series of concept cars that have been promoted into production
 id Software, an American video game developer

Finance
 International dollar, common name for the Geary–Khamis dollar, a hypothetical unit of currency
 Invoice discounting, a form of Factoring (finance) in the UK

Politics
 Inclusive Democracy, a project that aims for direct, economic, social, and ecological democracy
 Independent Democrats, a political party in South Africa
 Identity and Democracy, a political group in the European Parliament

Science, technology, and mathematics

Biology and medicine
 Ide (fish), also spelled Id
 Infectious disease
 Infectious dose
 Intellectual disability, a generalized neurodevelopmental disorder

Computing
 Id (programming language), a parallel functional programming language
 iD (software), an editor for OpenStreetMap geodata
 id (Unix), a command to retrieve group and user identification
 .id, the Internet Top Level Domain code for Indonesia
 id, the generic object datatype in the Objective-C programming language
 Instruction decoder, a decoder in CPUs
 Internet Draft, a working document of the IETF

Design and engineering
 Industrial design, a process of designing products for mass production
 Information design, the practice of presenting information in a way that fosters understanding
 Inside diameter, also 'inner diameter' or 'I.D.'; a dimension commonly used to specify the size of tubing or pipe
 Interaction design, the practice of designing interactive digital products, environments, systems, and services
 Interior design, the art and science of enhancing the interior of a building
 Instructional design, the study of creating better instructional experiences

Mathematics
 Identity function, a function that always returns the same value that was used as its argument
 Influence diagram, a graphical and mathematical representation of a decision situation
 Icosidodecahedron, a uniform polyhedron

Psychology
 Id, one of the Id, ego and super-ego psychic apparatus defined in Sigmund Freud's structural model of the psyche

Other uses
 ID (classification), a Paralympic rowing classification
 Id., Latin, short for idem (translation: "the same"), used in legal citations to refer to the previous citation 
 Indonesian language (ISO 639-1 code "id"), a standardized register of Malay
 Id (cuneiform), a common-use sign in cuneiform texts
 Intelligent design, a pseudoscientific argument for the existence of God

See also
 1D (disambiguation)
 LD (disambiguation)
 Identification (disambiguation)